Aminpur Thana is a thana of Pabna District.

Location

The name Aminpur Thana refers to the village of Aminpur, in the Jatsakhni Union of Bera Upazila in the Pabna District of Bangladesh. It is located beside the Attrai River on national highway NH5 between Kazirhat Launch Terminal and Kashinathpur. Aminpur Thana is near Manikgonj and Rajbari. Shibalaya is to the east of Aminpur Thana, Rajbari and Goalanda to the south, Sujanagar to the west, and Bera and Santhia Upazila are to its north.

Rivers
The Atrai near the River Aminpur has dried up. The Jamuna river is in the east and the Padma river flows to the south and the river plains of Badai.

History

Aminpur village was an ancient settlement that developed when a Muslim land surveyor or amin temporarily settled in the area.

In 1995, the Dhalcher area was known as the Turbaned area of Pabna.

In 1997, the regional government created a Police Investigation Center in Aminpur village to help establish control. On 20 October 2013, the retired air vice-marshal Abdul Karem Khandkher inaugurated the Aminpur Police Station as the 11th police station in Aminpur Thana.

Union council
There are eight unions in Aminpur Thana. Five are from Bera and three are from Sujanagar:
Jatshakhini Union
Ruppur Union
Masumdia Union
Dhalar char union
Puran Bharenga Union
Sagorkandi Union
Ahammadpur Union
Raninagar Union

Transportation
The distance from Aminpur to Pabna District is 49 km. Rajshahi is 153 km away. The distance between Aminpur to national parliament is 88 km via Aricha Ghat . The distance between Aminpur to Dhaka via Bangabondhu bridge about 200 km.

The Pabna-Dhalchar rail route goes through Aminpur Police Station. There are two stations: Badaherhat Station (Kadamtala) and Dhalar Char Station.

Economics
60% of the population work in the agricultural sector, 30% in textile industry, and the remaining 10% are employed in other sectors. The government of Bangladesh enhanced rice making as noted in the article by the Bangladesh council of Scientific & Industrial research.

Education
Aminpur Thana has an average literacy rate of 62%, of which 35% are males and 27% are females. Aminpur Thana has eight colleges, 23 high schools, 80 primary schools, 20 madrasa, and two vocational schools.

Healthcare 
Aminpur police station has one sub-health center. There are eight union health care centers and two community clinics.

Sub-health center:

 Rajnarayanpur sub-health center

Union Healthcare:
Puran Varenga Union Health Center
Jatsakhni Union Health Care Center
Ruppur Union Health Care Center
Mashumudia Union Health Care Center
Dhalachar Union Healthcare Center
Sagarkandi Union Healthcare Center
Raninagar Union Health Care Center
Ahmedpur Union Health Care Center

Notable inhabitants
AK Khandaker, (Bir Uttam), artist

References

Upazilas of Pabna District